Sangili Bungili Kadhava Thorae is a 2017 Indian Tamil-language horror comedy film written and directed by Ike, and produced by Fox Star Studios and Atlee under his production house 'A for Apple Productions'. The film stars Jiiva, Sri Divya, and Soori while Radha Ravi, Raadhika Sarathkumar, and Thambi Ramaiah play supporting roles. Featuring music composed by Vishal Chandrasekhar.

The film began production during March 2016 and was released on 19 May 2017. It was dubbed in Hindi as Sangili Bungli Darwaza Khol.

Plot
Vasu is a house broker who sells houses by using tricks with his friend Sooranam. Vasu and his mother Parvathy are living in her brother's house for rent. Vasu and his parents had lived in houses for rent throughout their lives. After Vasu's father's death, he took a vow of buying a bungalow on the outskirts.

After some years, Vasu buys the bungalow and enters the house with his whole family. He later finds that there was a family that had lived there earlier. Jambulingam lived there with his wife, mother, and daughters. He refused to move out of the house, so Vasu decides to live there until he finds the owner who cheated him. Vasu and Jambulingam's daughter Shwetha fall in love with each other. Vasu and Sooranam try some ghost tricks to chase Jambulingam's family out of the house.

On learning of Vasu and Shwetha, Vasu's aunt is angered because she believed that her daughter Sandhya and Vasu will marry. She goes on a tirade about Vasu's actions to Parvathy. Parvathy tells Vasu to apologize to his aunt. He refuses, and his family moves out of the house. While Vasu and Sooranam threaten Jambulingam's deaf and dumb mother with a ghost, she sees a real ghost and is admitted in the hospital. Jambulingam blames Vasu for threatening his mother with ghosts and shows a video taken in the phone unknowingly. Shwetha also fights with Vasu, and the family moves out of the house.

Vasu brings E. B. Rajeshwari to learn about the ghost. Sangili Aandavar lived in the house and was killed by his family members for the house. She tells that if the two families live happily in the house, Aandavar will go out of the house. They live in the house happily, but Jambulingam does not like to stay there. He brings his family out and locks Vasu's family inside, but when he turns, he realises that he is inside the house and all others are outside. Aandavar takes Jambulingam, but the whole family tries to rescue Jambulingam by showing strength and unity. On seeing this, Aandavar leaves the house, and Vasu lives in the house with his mother, Shwetha, and the whole family.

Cast

Jiiva as Vasu
Sri Divya as Shwetha
Radha Ravi as Sangili Aandavar
Soori as Soornam
Raadhika Sarathkumar as Parvathy
Thambi Ramaiah as Jambulingam
Madhumila as Sandhya
Ilavarasu as Parvathy's brother
Kovai Sarala as E. B. Rajeshwari
Devadarshini as Swetha's mother
Senthi Kumari as Vasu's aunt
Motta Rajendran as Chairman
Kausalya as Aandavar's sister
Saravana Subbiah as Andavar's brother-in-law
R. Amarendran as Singapore Singaram
Mayilsamy as Tea Shop Owner
R. S. Shivaji as Nandakumar
Uday Mahesh as Vasu's father
Shanthi Mani as Jambulingam's mother
Tamilselvi as Aandavar's sister-in-law
Vaishali Thaniga as Shwetha's friend
Suhashini as Mrs. David
Nivas Adithan as Sangili's son
Jai in a cameo appearance
 Premgi Amaren as Prem (voice-only)
 Daniel Annie Pope as a driver in a cameo appearance
Akshara Gowda in a cameo appearance

Production
In December 2015, Jiiva announced that he would work on a new film to be directed by newcomer Ike, an erstwhile assistant of Kamal Haasan. Raja Rani Productions Atlee would work on the film as the producer alongside Fox Star Studios, while Sridivya would play the lead female role. Jiiva revealed that he shared a good comfort level with both Ike and Atlee, who he had worked with during the making of Nanban (2012). He further stated that the film would be reminiscent of the horror comedy films earlier made by director Priyadarshan.

The film began production during March 2016 with the first schedule held in Pazhani. The title of the film, Sangili Bungili Kadhava Thorae (name of a song from Muni 2: Kanchana) was also unveiled during the first schedule. Actors Jai and Akshara Gowda appeared in cameo roles as a NRI couple in the film, and shot for the film during the first week of the shoot.

Soundtrack 
The soundtrack was composed by Vishal Chandrasekhar, while the film's audio rights are secured by Sony Music.

References

External links

2017 films
2017 horror films
Films scored by Vishal Chandrasekhar
2010s Tamil-language films
Indian comedy horror films
Fox Star Studios films
2017 directorial debut films